Edinburg, also known as Edinburgh, is an unincorporated community located within West Windsor Township in Mercer County, New Jersey, United States. The community is located at the junction of Old Trenton Road (County Routes 526 and 535), Edinburg Road (CR 526), and Windsor Road (CR 641).

In October 2019, the Historical Society of West Windsor published an online museum exploring the history of West Windsor- including that of Edinburg.

References

West Windsor, New Jersey
Unincorporated communities in Mercer County, New Jersey
Unincorporated communities in New Jersey